Shui Mei Tsuen is a village in the Kam Tin area of Yuen Long District, Hong Kong.

Administration
Shui Mei Tsuen is a recognized village under the New Territories Small House Policy.

History 
In January 2022, a pet dog was surrounded and beaten to death by four male inhabitants of the village; one was arrested. The dog's owner said that she begged the men for mercy, and that the assailants also threatened to beat her as well.

Further reading 
  (about Shui Mei Tsuen and Shui Tau Tsuen)

References

External links

 Delineation of area of existing village Shui Mei Tsuen (Kam Tin) for election of resident representative (2019 to 2022)
 Antiquities and Monuments Office. Hong Kong Traditional Chinese Architectural Information System. Shui Mei Tsuen
 Antiquities Advisory Board. Historic Building Appraisal. Tang Tsing Lok Ancestral Hall, No. 297 Shui Mei Tsuen Pictures
 Antiquities Advisory Board. Historic Building Appraisal. Tang Chan Yui Kuen Ancestral Hall, No. 201 Shui Mei Tsuen Pictures
 Antiquities Advisory Board. Historic Building Appraisal. Tin Hau Temple, No. 62 Shui Mei Tsuen Pictures

Villages in Yuen Long District, Hong Kong
Kam Tin